Michael Dennis Kekich (born April 2, 1945) is an American former professional baseball pitcher in Major League Baseball who played for the Los Angeles Dodgers, New York Yankees, Cleveland Indians, Texas Rangers and Seattle Mariners in parts of nine seasons spanning 1965–1977. In 1974, he played in Japan for the Nippon-Ham Fighters.

Career
Kekich was a left-handed pitcher who began his career as a starter but later moved to the bullpen as a reliever. He had a modestly successful career in the Major Leagues, but he is best remembered for trading families with fellow Yankees pitcher Fritz Peterson before the 1973 season. The trade worked out better for Peterson, who later married Kekich's wife, Susanne, than it did for Kekich, who soon broke up with Peterson's wife, Marilyn.

After his big league career ended, Kekich attempted a comeback in the Mexican League, but this proved unsuccessful. He is remarried and currently resides near Albuquerque, New Mexico.

References

External links

Mike Kekich at Baseball Almanac
Mike Kekich at Baseball Gauge
Mike Kekich at Pura Pelota (Venezuelan Professional Baseball League)
Details of the Peterson-Kekich trade

1945 births
Living people
Albuquerque Dodgers players
American expatriate baseball players in Japan
American expatriate baseball players in Mexico
American people of Serbian descent
Arizona Instructional League Dodgers players
Baseball players from San Diego
Cleveland Indians players
Gold Coast Suns (baseball) players
Indios de Ciudad Juárez (minor league) players
Leones del Caracas players
American expatriate baseball players in Venezuela
Los Angeles Dodgers players
Major League Baseball pitchers
Mexican League baseball pitchers
Minor league baseball managers
New York Yankees players
Nippon Ham Fighters players
Nippon Professional Baseball pitchers
San Jose Missions players
Santa Barbara Dodgers players
Santo Domingo Azucareros players
Seattle Mariners players
Spokane Indians players
St. Petersburg Saints players
Tecolotes de Nuevo Laredo players
Texas Rangers players
Tiburones de La Guaira players
Tigres de Aragua players